Titel  is a town and municipality in Serbia

Titel may also refer to:
Titel Hill, a loess hillock situated in the Vojvodina province, Serbia
Constantin Titel Petrescu, a Romanian politician and lawyer

See also
Title